Craig Buntin (born May 27, 1980) is a Canadian former pair skater. He is the co-founder and CEO of Sportlogiq, an AI-powered sports analytics company based in Montreal, Quebec. With former partner Meagan Duhamel, he is the 2009 Canadian silver medallist, the 2008 & 2010 Canadian bronze medallist, and the 2010 Four Continents bronze medallist. With Valérie Marcoux, he represented Canada at the 2006 Winter Olympics, where they placed 11th.

Personal life 
Buntin was born on May 27, 1980 in North Vancouver, British Columbia. He studied for his MBA degree at McGill University. He married in August 2011.

Career

Early partnerships 
Buntin won the 2000 Canadian junior national title with Chantal Poirier. He teamed up with Valérie Marcoux in 2002. The pair won gold at three consecutive Canadian Championships, from 2004 to 2006. Their partnership ended in early 2007 when Valérie Marcoux decided to retire from competition.

Partnership with Duhamel 
In June 2007, Buntin teamed up with Meagan Duhamel. At their first competition together, the 2007 Nebelhorn Trophy, they won the silver medal. In January 2008, the pair won the bronze medal at the Canadian Nationals but during the exhibition Buntin injured his shoulder, with which he had previous problems, as a result of a timing issue. They missed the Four Continents but competed at the 2008 World Championships in Sweden on March 19, 2008, despite the shoulder still being a problem, and finished 6th. However, their participation aggravated Buntin's injury, tearing the rotator cuff, the labrum and three tendons; he had surgery in April and the recovery took seven to eight months. They could not practice lifts until two weeks before 2008 Skate America so they worked on adding variations to their elements, such as a spread eagle entrance into a lift and a death spiral with the opposite hand. In November 2008, during the long program at the Trophée Eric Bompard, Duhamel accidentally sliced Buntin's hand a minute into the program on a move right after their side-by-side toe loop jumps and blood dripped on the ice; the pair stopped to get his hand bandaged and resumed the program to win the bronze medal. Duhamel and Buntin were the first pair to successfully land a throw triple lutz in competition.

In July 2010, Buntin announced his retirement from competitive figure skating.

Programs

With Duhamel

With Marcoux

Competitive highlights 
GP: Grand Prix; JGP: Junior Grand Prix

With Duhamel

With Marcoux

Early career

References

External links 

Skate Canada Profile
 

1980 births
Sportspeople from British Columbia
Canadian male pair skaters
Olympic figure skaters of Canada
Figure skaters at the 2006 Winter Olympics
Living people
People from North Vancouver
Four Continents Figure Skating Championships medalists